The Journal of South Asian Development is a peer reviewed journal. It is a forum for discussing all facets of development in South Asia, comprising Afghanistan, Pakistan, India, Sri Lanka, Bangladesh, Nepal, Bhutan and the Maldives, and is published three times in a year by SAGE Publications. The Journal was launched in 2006.

It is a member of the Committee on Publication Ethics.

Editorial Board
An Editorial Board, editors, associate editors, and a book review editor make up the Journal's editorial staff.

As of 2018, the editors include Vegard Iversen, Carol Upadhya, Geert De Neve, Joe Devine, and Sabyasachi Kar. The Editorial Board includes Ashutosh Varshney, Katy Gardner, Andrew Wyatt, Craig Jeffrey and Kaushik Basu among others.

Abstracting and indexing
Journal of South Asian Development is abstracted and indexed in:

 Australian Business Deans Council
 CCC
 DeepDyve
 Dutch-KB
 EBSCO
 EconLit
 J-Gate
 OCLC
 Ohio
 Portico
 ProQuest: International Bibliography of the Social Sciences (IBSS)
 ProQuest-Illustrata
 Research Papers in Economics (RePEc)
 SCOPUS
 Social Sciences Citation Index (Web of Science)

References

External links
 
 Homepage

SAGE Publishing academic journals
Triannual journals
Development studies journals
Publications established in 2006